Just Another War in Space is a 1991 video game published by Azeroth Publishing.

Gameplay
Just Another War in Space is a one-player strategic tactical game of space combat, in which the player can either ally with the Empire or the Federation.

Reception
Hosea Battles, Jr. reviewed the game for Computer Gaming World, and stated that "this is an excellent tactical level combat game with a few strategic decisions (sort of an "opposite twin brother" to Star Control). It will appeal to those who like strategic wargaming with plenty of on-screen action."

Greg Knauss for STart said that "With a GEM front-end, I would easily recommend it to anyone looking for detailed space combat, but as it is, only the dedicated are likely to want to take the time."

Reviews
Computer Gaming World - May, 1994

References

1991 video games
Atari ST games
Atari ST-only games
Real-time strategy video games
Science fiction video games
Video games developed in the United States
Computer wargames
Video games set in outer space